Rio Verde (Portuguese for "green river") is a river of Mato Grosso state in western Brazil.  It flows through the city of Lucas do Rio Verde.

See also
List of rivers of Mato Grosso

References
Brazilian Ministry of Transport

Rivers of Mato Grosso